This is a list of Saint Kitts and Nevis billionaires based on an annual assessment of wealth and assets compiled and published by Forbes magazine in 2021.

2021 Saint Kitts and Nevis billionaires list

See also
 The World's Billionaires
 List of countries by the number of billionaires

References

Saint Kitts and Nevis
net worth
 
Billionaires